Moniteau County Courthouse Square is a national historic district located at California, Moniteau County, Missouri.   The district encompasses 21 contributing buildings and 1 contributing site in the central business district of California. It developed between about 1867 and 1900, and includes representative examples of Classic Revival architecture. Contributing buildings include the Moniteau County Courthouse (1867-1868) and a variety of commercial buildings contemporary with the courthouse, dating from the mid to late-19th century.

It was listed on the National Register of Historic Places in 1970.

References

Historic districts on the National Register of Historic Places in Missouri
Neoclassical architecture in Missouri
Buildings and structures in Moniteau County, Missouri
National Register of Historic Places in Moniteau County, Missouri